Age of Wonders II: The Wizard's Throne is a turn-based strategy video game in a fantasy setting. The sequel to Age of Wonders, it was developed by Dutch video game developer Triumph Studios.

Gameplay
Unlike in Age of Wonders, where the player has the option of removing their leader from the map, players in Age of Wonders II take the role of an immortal spell-casting Wizard, who cannot be upgraded, but in certain circumstances can survive being killed.

In contrast to Age of Wonders, the maps for tactical battles are now much smaller. This led to faster combat and less maneuvering of units. Also in contrast to its predecessor, when gaining new levels Heroes can no longer choose new skills from a list of all available skills; instead, the player is forced to choose one of three offered skills, depending on the Hero's class.

In Age of Wonders, magic is used via the spell casting abilities of leaders and heroes, and global spells can be cast some distance away from the hero; use of spells in combat is restricted to battles where a hero with spell casting is present.

Magic use in Age of Wonders II uses a "domain" system; spells can only be cast within the domain of the casting wizard, or the domain of an allied wizard. Magic domains can overlap with each other, and in the simple case, are centered on the Wizard. When a Wizard is present in a Wizard's Tower, the radius of the domain increases significantly, and in addition is radiated by other Wizard's Towers, Magic Relays and Heroes under the control of the player. Global spells can only be cast by the Wizard, via a spell book located in the main user interface; spells can be cast in combat by either Heroes involved in the battle, or (provided the battle takes place inside their domain) the Wizard who controls any party which entered the battle.

Development

Reception

Improved audio quality and graphics, sub-quests from various gods, more races and build options as well as two large single-player campaigns made most of the large fanbase of Age of Wonders migrating to Age of Wonders II: The Wizard's Throne; this was aided by the involvement of members of the HeavenGames community in suggestions, testing and development of the game.

GameSpot named Age of Wonders II a runner-up for its June 2002 "PC Game of the Month" award.

Age of Wonders II was a nominee for PC Gamer USs "2002 Best Turn-Based Strategy Game" award, which ultimately went to Combat Mission: Barbarossa to Berlin. It was also a finalist for The Electric Playgrounds 2002 "Best Strategy Game for PC" prize, but lost to Warcraft III: Reign of Chaos. It was a runner-up for GameSpots annual "Most Improved Sequel on PC" and "Best Game No One Played on PC" awards.

References

External links
 Official website via Internet Archive
 Age of Wonders II: The Wizard's Throne at Triumph Studios
 

2002 video games
4X video games
Fantasy video games
Gathering of Developers games
Multiplayer and single-player video games
Play-by-email video games
Turn-based strategy video games
Video game sequels
Video games with isometric graphics
Video games developed in the Netherlands
Windows games
Windows-only games

de:Age of Wonders#Age of Wonders II: Der Zirkel der Zauberer